Slaughterhouse Derby Girls is a women's flat track roller derby league based in Greeley, Colorado. Founded in 2007, the league currently consists of three home teams, and two mixed teams which compete against teams from other leagues. Slaughterhouse is a member of the Women's Flat Track Derby Association (WFTDA).

History
The league was founded in November 2007 by "RollaRella", who had previously skated with FoCo Girls Gone Derby, and played its first bout in May 2008. In October, it opened its own rink, known as "The Kill Floor", and described by the Fort Collins Coloradoan as having a "chilling underground ambiance".

Slaughterhouse was accepted as a member of the Women's Flat Track Derby Association early in 2009. Since 2011, the league has hosted the Mayday Mayhem invitational tournament.

WFTDA rankings

References

Greeley, Colorado
Roller derby leagues established in 2007
Roller derby leagues in Colorado
Women's Flat Track Derby Association Division 3
2007 establishments in Colorado